Victorino Mapa Street, also known by its short form V. Mapa Street, is the main north–south road in the district of Santa Mesa in Manila, Philippines. It is home to Don Bosco School, Manila, Unciano Colleges and General Hospital, and several new condominiums and a few motels.

A portion of the street forms part of Radial Road 5 (R-5) of Manila's arterial road network where it links with Padre Sanchez Street (named after Jesuit priest Francisco de Paula Sanchez from the Ateneo Municipal de Manila) and eventually connects to Shaw Boulevard in Mandaluyong. It is served by V. Mapa LRT Station along Magsaysay Boulevard. Its section from its northern terminus at Magsaysay Boulevard to Valenzuela Street is designated as part of National Route 183 (N183), while its section from Valenzuela Street to P. Sanchez Street is designated as part of National Route 141 (N141); both numbered routes are part of the Philippine highway system. The rest of the route up to Pat Antonio Street is an unnumbered street.

History
Victorino Mapa Street was formerly known as Calle Buenavista and was one of the earliest streets laid out by the Spanish government in the former pueblo of Santa Mesa. It was the home of the old Sociedad de Tiro al Blanco (Manila Gun Club) located near the junction with Calle Valenzuela. The street was extended north from Calle Santa Mesa (now Old Santa Mesa Road) to the new boulevard built during the U.S. colonial period called Santa Mesa Boulevard (now Magsaysay Boulevard). It was renamed in 1929 through Republic Act 3581 after the second Chief Justice of the Supreme Court of the Philippines. During World War II, its section between Valenzuela and P. Sanchez Streets was also known as or part of Pasig Boulevard (including Shaw Boulevard) which used to refer to the road or network of roads connecting Manila and Pasig (then a municipality and provincial seat of Rizal).

Notes

References

Streets in Manila
Santa Mesa